Minervois is an AOC in the Languedoc-Roussillon wine region, in the departments of the Aude and of the Herault. Historically, the region's capital has been the village of Minerve.

AOC regulations require the wine to be blended (at least 2 varieties), so pure varietal wines must be  Vin de Pays. The red wines of the Minervois appellation are produced from Syrah and Mourvedre, Grenache and Lladoner Pelut (minimum 60%); and Carignan, Cinsault, Piquepoul, Terret, and Rivairenc (maximum 40%). In any case Syrah and  Mourvedre needs to be at least 20% of total, and Piquepoul, Terret, and Rivairenc needs to be no more than 10%.

The white wines, which are less commonly found, may include Marsanne, Roussanne, Maccabeu, Bourboulenc, Clairette, Grenache, Vermentino, Piquepoul and Muscat Blanc a Petits Grains.

See also
List of Vins de Primeur
List of appellations in Languedoc-Roussillon

References

External links
The Minervois wine Region

Languedoc-Roussillon wine AOCs